KMUP-1 is a xanthine derivative with phosphodiesterase inhibitor activity.

Synthesis
Note that the piperazine used has dual use in the synthesis of Mefeclorazine [1243-33-0].

The conjoining of Theophylline [58-55-9] (1) with 1,2-dibromoethane [106-93-4] (2) gives 7-(2-Bromoethyl)-theophylline [23146-05-6] (3). Alkylation with 1-(2-Chlorophenyl)Piperazine [39512-50-0] (4) completed the synthesis of KMUP-1 (5).

References

Phosphodiesterase inhibitors
Xanthines
Piperazines
Chloroarenes